Sparganothina flava is a species of moth of the family Tortricidae. It is found in Ecuador (Morona-Santiago Province).

The ground colour of the forewings is cream, sprinkled and strigulated with rust. The markings are rust. The hindwings are white cream with weak pale ferruginous strigulae in the apical third.

Etymology
The species name refers to the brown powdered light-yellow background colour of the forewings and is derived from Latin flava (meaning yellow).

References

External links

Moths described in 2006
Endemic fauna of Ecuador
Sparganothini
Moths of South America
Taxa named by Józef Razowski